The 2017–18 Premier League was a professional association football league season in England.

2017–18 Premier League may also refer to:

Association football
 2017–18 Armenian Premier League
 2017–18 Azerbaijan Premier League
 2017–18 Premier League of Belize
 2017–18 Premier League of Bosnia and Herzegovina
 2017–18 Egyptian Premier League
 2017–18 Hong Kong Premier League
 2017–18 Iraqi Premier League
 2017–18 Israeli Premier League
 2017–18 Kuwaiti Premier League
 2017–18 Lebanese Premier League
 2017–18 Maltese Premier League
 2017–18 National Premier League (Jamaica)
 2017–18 Russian Premier League
 2017–18 Syrian Premier League
 2017–18 Tanzanian Premier League
 2017–18 Ukrainian Premier League
 2017–18 Welsh Premier League

Basketball
 2017–18 Icelandic Premier League
 2017–18 Irish Premier League season, a 2018 basketball season

Cricket
2017 Bangladesh Premier League
2017 Indian Premier League
2017–18 Premier League Tournament (Sri Lanka)

See also
 2017–18 Premier League International Cup